The Lepsius list of pyramids is a list of sixty-seven ancient Egyptian pyramids established in 1842–1843 by Karl Richard Lepsius (1810–1884), an Egyptologist and leader of the "Prussian expedition to Egypt" from 1842 until 1846.

The Lepsius list of pyramid is the first attempt at systematically listing all the Egyptian pyramids, and as such, is a pioneering effort of early modern Egyptology. The list was published together with the results of the expedition in Lepsius work Denkmäler aus Aegypten und Aethiopien (1849–1859).

List

History

Following the success of the Franco-Tuscan Expedition to Egypt under the leadership of Jean-François Champollion, the Prussian scientists Alexander von Humboldt and Robert Wilhelm Bunsen and the minister of instruction Johann Eichhorn recommended to king Frederick William IV that an expedition be sent to Egypt.
Karl Richard Lepsius, who had learned of Champollion's method to decipher the hieroglyphs and had met Ippolito Rosellini of the Franco-Tuscan Expedition, was chosen to lead it. The main aim of the expedition was to explore and record the remains of the ancient Egyptian civilization as well as to gather materials for the Egyptian Museum of Berlin.

The Prussian expedition assembled in Alexandria in 1842 and quickly departed for Giza, which was reached in November that same year. Proceeding north to south, Lepsius's men then explored the pyramids field of Abusir, Saqqara, Dahshur and, in 1843, Hawara. Lepsius and team stayed for 6 months in total at these locations, as the Prussian expedition was the first to study and record Old Kingdom material in depth.

In total, Lepsius and his men uncovered a total of 67 pyramids and 130 tombs. The pyramids, dating from the Third Dynasty (c. 2686–2613 BCE) until the Thirteenth Dynasty (c. 1800–1650 BCE), were given Roman numerals from north to south, starting from Abu Rawash in the north. Although a few of the structures reported by Lepsius are now known to have been mastabas and other monumental structures (highlighted on the list below in light gray), the Lepsius list of pyramids is still considered a pioneering achievement of modern Egyptology. Lepsius' numerals have remained the standard designation for some of the pyramids.

The results of the Prussian expedition to Egypt, comprising the list of pyramids, were published in the Denkmäler aus Aegypten und Aethiopien.

Pyramids

Lepsius' maps
Lepsius drew maps of the locations his expedition visited and which regroup the pyramid listed above. They are presented below, from north to south.

References

Bibliography

List
Archaeological sites in Egypt
Pyramids
Pyramids, Egyptian, Lepsius